Katherine Barnett Rosman (born March 2, 1972) is an American writer and reporter who works as a Domestic Correspondent for The New York Times, previously at The Wall Street Journal. Rosman is known for her extensive coverage of the internet, celebrity, and their intersection with the public eye. She is known for widely read pieces with subjects including but not limited to the inner-workings of the National Football League and Planned Parenthood, and pop culture. She wrote a book called If You Knew Suzy: A Mother, A Daughter, a Reporter's Notebook.

Early life and education 
Katherine Rosman was born in Detroit, Michigan, to Bob Rosman (first cousin of Allene Miller Doctoroff, mother of Daniel L. Doctoroff) and the late Suzanne "Suzy" Rosman (later Rosin) née Goldberg. Her maternal grandfather, Leo Goldberg, was a renowned scientist. She graduated from the University of Michigan College of Literature, Science, and the Arts in 1994 with a Bachelor of Arts degree. She has three sisters, all of whom grew up in the Detroit area. Her mother, Suzy Rosin (1944–2005), was the basis of her 2008 book.

She is of Polish Jewish descent, maternally. Paternally, she is of Russian-Jewish descent. Her paternal grandfather, Carl Rosman (1914–2005), arrived at Ellis Island on August 4, 1922, on the S.S. Berengaria with his parents Emanuel and Rose and his sisters Irma and Berta from Transylvania. On other sides of the family, she is of Sephardic descent from Spain, Italy, and other Southeastern European countries; from Purcăreni, and other Ashkenazi and Sephardic regions.

Career 
Rosman moved to New York City and became an assistant to Elaina Richardson at Elle magazine. In 2004, she was hired as a staff reporter by The Wall Street Journal. In 2014, she joined the staff of The New York Times. She is the author of the memoir, If You Knew Suzy, published by HarperCollins in 2010. Rosman was a finalist in the feature category for the Gerald Loeb Awards for her story, "The Itsy-Bitsy, Teenie-Weenie, Very Litigious Bikini". She has been written about by the Harvard Business Review based on her "Survival Guide to Journalism in the Social Media Age". In February 2019, a story by Rosman caused a Times reporter and photographer to be disinvited from the Vanity Fair Oscar party. Dylan Byers, a senior media reporter at NBC and MSNBC tweeted, "I have decided not to attend this year's Vanity Fair Oscars party in light of their decision to ban the [New York Times] on account of their very legitimate reporting. The decision to ban the Times because of critical reporting is incongruous with journalistic values Vanity Fair claims to uphold." A Times reporter, Edmund Lee, also tweeted of the event, "After great reporting by [Katherine Rosman and Brooks Barnes] on Vanity Fair Oscars party, Conde Nast saw fit to ban Times reporters from covering the event. This, from a publication that touts journalism." Others protested the event as well. She also starred in a 2019 documentary called Secrets of Sugar Baby Dating, directed by Joyce Trozzo in relation to a story she wrote an article called "A 'Sugar Date' Gone Sour" on October 15, 2018, then "The 'Sugar Dater'" on October 19, 2018, followed by more. 

In recent years, Rosman has covered a wide variety of topics including Jay Z, his entertainment agency, Roc Nation, the #MeToo movement, abortion access for disabled persons, and the National Football League.

Rosman continues to write about current events, publishing a fluctuating amount of articles in The New York Times each month. In January 2023, The New York Times announced that Rosman would depart from the Styles section "after a run of enthralling stories" and move to the Metro section. At Metro, she is expected to cover news in New York, Connecticut, and New Jersey. 

Rosman was a winner of the Best in Business Award from the Society of American Business Editors in 2018.

Personal life 
Rosman resides in New York City with her husband, Joe Ehrlich, and two children, Ariel Ehrlich and Eleanor Ehrlich. Her husband, Ehrlich, is a descendant of Alexander Hamilton and is thus a contemporary member of the Schuyler-Hamilton family. She lives between Tuxedo Park, New York and the Upper West Side. Rosman and her husband do yoga, which she shares on her social media often. 

She is on the Board of Directors of Yaddo, along with previous colleague Elaina H. Richardson, the President, as well as Janice Y. K. Lee. She is also on the Board of Directors of The Schuyler Family Association and serves as the Board Editor and Chairman of The Publications Committee.

References

External links
  Official Twitter
 Stories published by the New York Times

The New York Times writers
The Wall Street Journal people
American women journalists
1972 births
Living people
University of Michigan College of Literature, Science, and the Arts alumni
American women writers
Elle (magazine) writers
Writers from Detroit
American people of Russian-Jewish descent
American people of Romanian-Jewish descent
American people of Polish-Jewish descent
The New York Times people
University of Michigan alumni
Jewish American writers
Writers from New York City
21st-century American Jews
21st-century American women